Moonfire is a 1970 action adventure film written, produced, and directed by Michael Parkhurst. It was photographed in the De Luxe colour system.

It starred Richard Egan, Charles Napier, and former World Heavyweight Champion boxer Sonny Liston. It portrays truckers battling a Nazi hiding in Mexico. There is a subplot about the disappearance of a reclusive billionaire.

Cast

 Richard Egan – Sam Blue
 Charles Napier – Robert W. Morgan
 Sonny Liston – The Farmer
 Dayton Lummis – Fuentes
 Joaquín Martínez – Lazaro (as Joaquin Martinez)
 Richard Bull – Hawkins
 Rodolfo Hoyos, Jr. – Pedro (as Rudolfo Hoyos)
 Jose Gonzales-Gonzales – Jesus (as Jose Gonzales Gonzales)
 William Wintersole – Larry Benjamin
 Patricia Magrini – Benjamin's Secretary
 Duncan Inches – Benjamin's Assistant #1
 Jack Dickson – Benjamin's Assistant #2
 Rod Bird – Messenger
 Sandy Rosenthal – Ira Morris
 Ira Morris – Message Reader in Truck Stop
 Alfred G. Bosnos – Truck Broker (as Al Bosnos)
 Sam Dermengian – A.C.C. Inspector
 Robert Panizza – Tourist in Cadillac
 Malcolm Alexander – Jesse James
 Monica Marie – Ice Cream Girl
 Sarah Dobbs – Motel Girl
 Roger Galloway – Multiple Roles

See also
 List of American films of 1970

References

External links
 
 

1970 films
1970s action adventure films
American action adventure films
Films set in Mexico
Trucker films
1970s English-language films
1970s American films